Lars Martinson (born 1977) is an American cartoonist.

Life
Lars Martinson was born in 1977 in Minnesota. From 2003 to 2006, he lived and worked in Japan as an assistant English teacher with the JET Program. In 2007, he received a Xeric Grant for Comic Book Self-Publishers that allowed him to work on his graphic novel Tōnoharu. He went back to Japan in 2008 to study East Asian calligraphy with a two-year research scholarship from the Japanese government. He returned to Japan in July 2011 again to work with the JET Program.

Work
Tōnoharu is the story of Dan Wells, an American assistant English teacher in rural Japan. It is inspired by Martinson's experience. It is a self-deprecatory, tender and humorous description of the daily life of an isolated dull unimaginative foreigner in a country whose language he does not master.

Books
 Young Men of a certain Mind, self-published, 2003
 Tōnoharu, Part One, Pliant Press, 2008 (Paperback edition: Top Shelf Productions, September 2014).
 Tōnoharu, Part Two, Pliant Press, 2010
 Tonoharu (French translation of both volumes), Le lézard noir, 2011
 Tōnoharu, Part Three, Pliant Press, November 2016, .

References

External links
 

American cartoonists
American graphic novelists
1977 births
Living people
American male novelists